The McLemore Cove Historic District near Kensington, Georgia, about  south of Chickamauga, Georgia, is a  historic district listed on the National Register of Historic Places.  It includes 262 contributing buildings, 15 other contributing structures, 15 contributing sites, and a contributing object, as well as 327 non-contributing buildings and structures.  It consists of the roughly triangular-shaped valley, McLemore Cove, between the ridge lines of Lookout Mountain on the west
and Pigeon Mountain on the east.

It includes a number of historic farm complexes, including the James W. Coulter Farm at the crossroads of W. Cove Road and Highway 193, and the Dougherty Farm, and many historic buildings.  George Cornish and John B. Bell were stonemasons who each built one or more buildings in the area.

References

Historic districts on the National Register of Historic Places in Georgia (U.S. state)
National Register of Historic Places in Walker County, Georgia